is a multi-use stadium built in Fujieda, Shizuoka Prefecture, Japan. It was used by Senegal for a precursory 2002 FIFA World Cup training camp. It is the home stadium of football club Fujieda MYFC.

Fujieda Soccer Stadium is football-specific, has floodlights and has a main stand equipped to seat 5000- evidently on par with some J1 League stadia. The rest of the stands is grass terracing.

Excluding a football pitch, it has an athletics field, golf course and skate park.

The football specific stadium has been renovated stand from 21 may 2022 until renovation complete schedule from end of 2023.

Gallery

References

Football venues in Japan
Sports venues in Shizuoka Prefecture
Fujieda, Shizuoka
Sports venues completed in 2002
2002 establishments in Japan
Fujieda MYFC